Seven Brief Lessons on Physics is a short book by the Italian physicist Carlo Rovelli. Originally published in Italian in 2014, by 2021 the book has been translated into 52 languages. More than a million copies have been sold, of which more than 400,000 in Italy.

Overview
The book condenses the revelations of post-Newtonian physics – from Einstein's theory of relativity to quantum mechanics – into seven brief, accessible lessons: These were originally serialised in an Italian newspaper. Rovelli's uses a literary approach, for instance, highlighting a year Einstein spent apparently aimlessly with the comment that those who don't waste time, won't get anywhere.

The chapters are:

 The Most Beautiful of Theories
 The Quanta
 The Architecture of the Cosmos
 Particles
 Grains of Space
 Probability, Time and the Heat of Black Holes
 Ourselves

References

2014 non-fiction books
Penguin Books books
Italian non-fiction books
Popular physics books